Many compilations of songs in the Geordie dialect of north-east England have been published, mainly in the 19th century.

The songbooks

The songs 
 The Amphitrite - writer Robert Gilchrist
 Asstrilly's Goold Fields - writer Edward Corvan
 Billy Boy
 Bob Cranky's Adieu - writer William Shield
 Bobby Shafto's Gone to Sea
 Broom Buzzems - writer William Purvis (Blind Willie)
 Ca' Hawkie through the watter - writer Unknown
 The Caller - writer Edward Corvan
 The Cliffs of Old Tynemouth - writer David Ross Lietch
 The Collier’s Rant - writer Unknown
 Come Geordie ha'd the bairn - writer Joe Wilson
 Cushie Butterfield - writer George Ridley
 Dance To Thy Daddy - writer William Watson
 Geordy Black - song - writer Rowland Harrison
 Hi, canny man - writer Harry Nelson
 Hydrophobie - writer Robert Emery
 Jemmy Joneson’s Whurry - writer Thomas Thompson
 Keep yor feet still Geordie hinny - writer Joe Wilson
 Newcassel Props - writer William Oliver
 The Newcassel Worthies - writer William “Willie” Armstrong
 The Pitman’s Courtship - writer William Mitford
 The Pitman’s Happy Times - writer Joseph Philip Robson
 The Pitman’s Revenge - writer George Cameron
 The Puddens That Me Mother Used Te Myek - writer Jack Robson
 The Skipper's Dream - writer T Moor
 When the Boat Comes In - writer William Watson
 Wor Geordie's lost his penka - writer Unknown
 Wor Nanny’s a mazer - writer Thomas “Tommy” Armstrong
 Wor Peg's Trip te Tynemouth - writer Joe Wilson

Publishers and printers 
 Thomas Allan
 George Angus
 Margaret Angus
 Thomas Angus
 John Bell (Junior)
 William Brockie
 John Collingwood Bruce
 James Catnach
 John Catnach
 John W. Chater
 Joseph Crawhall
 William Davison
 Scott Dobson
 W & T Fordyce
 P. France
 Ralph Hawkes
 John Marshall
 Thomas Marshall
 Joseph Ritson
 John Ross
 Cuthbert Sharp
 John Stokoe
 J. W. Swanston
 William R. Walker

Radio shows 
 Wot Cheor Geordie - radio show
 Geordierama - radio show

See also 
 Geordie dialect words
 Allan's Illustrated Edition of Tyneside Songs and Readings
 Fordyce's Tyne Songster
 France's Songs of the Bards of the Tyne - 1850
 The Bishoprick Garland (1834, by Sharp)
 Rhymes of Northern Bards
 Marshall's Collection of Songs, Comic, Satirical 1827
 The Songs of the Tyne by Ross
 The Songs of the Tyne by Walker
 Marshall's A Collection of original local songs

References

External links
 Allan's Illustrated Edition of Tyneside Songs and Readings
 The Tyne Songster by W & T Fordyce – 1840
 France's Songs of the Bards of the Tyne – 1850
 Marshall's Collection of Songs, Comic, Satirical 1827
 The Songs of the Tyne by Ross
 Sharpe's Bishoprick Garland 1834
 Bards of Newcastle
 Wor Geordie songwriters
 Bell's Rhymes of Northern Bards
 The Songs of the Tyne by Walker

Culture in Newcastle upon Tyne